Fritz Röll (16 March 1879 – 1 August 1956) was a German sculptor. His work was part of the sculpture event in the art competition at the 1936 Summer Olympics.

References

1879 births
1956 deaths
20th-century German sculptors
20th-century German male artists
German male sculptors
Olympic competitors in art competitions
People from Schmalkalden-Meiningen